The 2021 Vuelta a España was the 76th edition of Vuelta a España, one of cycling's Grand Tours. The Vuelta began in Burgos on 14 August, and Stage 11 from Antequera to Valdepeñas de Jaén occurred on 25 August. The race finished in Santiago de Compostela on 5 September.

Classification standings

Stage 1 
14 August 2021 – Burgos to Burgos,  (ITT)

The Vuelta began with a  individual time trial in Burgos. Immediately from the start at Burgos Cathedral, the riders began to go uphill before tackling the third-category Alto del Castillo, a  climb with an average gradient of 7.1 percent. The quickest rider at the top took the first blue polka-dot jersey as the leader of the mountains classification. Afterwards, the riders took on a  descent before a  flat section as the riders looped back towards the finish at the cathedral.

The first rider to set a benchmark time was the thirteenth rider to start, Omar Fraile, who, with a time of 8' 55", was the first rider to finish under nine minutes. Shortly after, Adam Yates beat Fraile's time, going three seconds quicker. Several riders threatened Yates' time before his teammate, Dylan van Baarle, went nine seconds quicker with a time of 8' 43". His time stood until Alex Aranburu finished with a time of 8' 38", five seconds faster than van Baarle. Aranburu stayed in the hot seat for a long time as multiple riders went faster than him on the climb before eventually falling short by the finish. Jan Tratnik, Tom Scully, and Josef Černý came closest to beating Aranburu's time but they fell short by two to four seconds. The last rider off the start ramp was the two-time defending champion, Primož Roglič. With a time of 8' 32", Roglič knocked Aranburu off the hot seat by six seconds to win the stage. In doing so, Roglič took the red and green jerseys as the first leader of the general and points classifications. Roglič's teammate, Sepp Kuss, set the fastest time atop the Alto del Castillo to take the blue polka-dot jersey while Andrea Bagioli, who finished seventh,  took the white jersey as the best young rider.

In the battle amongst the other GC favorites, Aleksandr Vlasov was the closest rider to Roglič at 14 seconds down. Romain Bardet and Enric Mas finished 17 and 18 seconds behind, respectively, while the other contenders lost between 20 and 40 seconds.

Stage 2 
15 August 2021 – Caleruega to Burgos, 

The second stage of the Vuelta featured a  course with an almost entirely flat terrain that suited the sprinters. There were no categorized climbs on the route apart from a few minor lumps on the course. With  to go, there was an intermediate sprint at Tardajos that offered three, two, and one bonus second(s) to the first three riders across, respectively.

As soon as the flag dropped, three riders, Diego Rubio, Sergio Martín, and Xabier Azparren, broke away from the peloton. The trio built a maximum advantage of around four minutes before  and  began to control the gap for their sprinters, Arnaud Démare and Fabio Jakobsen, respectively. The trio's advantage came down to around 33 seconds before the peloton knocked off the pace, allowing the break's lead to increase again to more than a minute and a half.

Almost immediately,  came to the front in an attempt to bring Alex Aranburu closer to the red jersey with the bonus seconds at the intermediate sprint. At the sprint, Aranburu was led out by his team, but Jakobsen came across first with Aranburu in second. With  to go, a crash took down some riders in the middle of the peloton. The crash caught some contenders out, including Adam Yates, Hugh Carthy, and David de la Cruz, with all three losing 30 seconds to a minute. In the final sprint to the line, Juan Sebastián Molano launched his sprint first but Jasper Philipsen came around him to win the stage. Second place went to Jakobsen, who was forced to take a longer route around Molano and the third-place finisher was Michael Matthews. With his win, Philipsen also took the lead in the points classification. Primož Roglič finished safely in the peloton to retain the red jersey.

After the stage, Alexander Cataford, who had gone down in the late crash, was diagnosed with a broken collarbone. As a result, he was unable to start stage 3 and became the first withdrawal of the race.

Stage 3 
16 August 2021 – Santo Domingo de Silos to Espinosa de los Monteros – Picón Blanco, 

The third stage featured the first summit finish of the race as the riders headed from Santo Domingo de Silos to Picón Blanco. The first  was undulating and included the third-category climb of Puerto del Manquillo, which crested after . Afterwards, the terrain was mostly flat until the riders passed through the intermediate sprint in Medina de Pomar with  left. With  to go, the riders tackled the third-category Alto de Bocos, a  climb with an average gradient of 6.3 percent. There were bonus seconds on offer for the first three riders to cross the summit.

Before the stage started, Frederik Frison became the second rider to abandon after suffering from a high fever; the Belgian rider's COVID-19 tests had all come back negative. A few kilometres after the flag dropped, Ryan Gibbons attempted to break away together with Antonio Jesús Soto. After the two were brought back, Soto tried to break away again and this time, he was joined by seven other riders. The eight-man break extended their lead to three minutes before  took control at the front of the peloton. At the top of the Puerto del Manquillo, Kenny Elissonde took maximum points to tie Sepp Kuss for the lead of the mountains classification. Over the next few kilometres, the break's advantage ballooned to nine minutes, making it almost certain that the someone from the break would win the stage. At the intermediate sprint, Julen Amezqueta took maximum points. With other teams taking over at the front, the peloton began to set a furious pace, bringing the break's lead down to about four minutes. At the top of the Alto de Bocos, Tobias Bayer took maximum points, which, when added to the points he had previously accumulated in the stage, catapulted him to the top of the virtual KOM standings.

With  to go, Lilian Calmejane attacked off the front, building an advantage of 20 seconds before being chased down ahead of the final climb of Picón Blanco. At the bottom of the climb, the break began to split apart, with Amezqueta, Calmejane, Elissonde, Joe Dombrowski, and Rein Taaramäe remaining up front.  from the top, Dombrowski upped the pace in the break, bringing only Taaramäe and Elissonde with him. Further up the climb, Taaramäe dropped his companions, eventually soloing to the stage win. Dombrowski took second, 21 seconds down, while Elissonde finished 36 seconds behind. In the GC group,  set a steady tempo on the final climb. David de la Cruz attacked but he was unable to build a gap. After losing time the previous day, Adam Yates put in a few digs but the headwind on the climb made it hard for the riders to create any gaps. Near the finish, Enric Mas accelerated from the group, gaining three seconds on a seven-man group of favourites. With the GC group crossing the line at almost two minutes behind Taaramäe, the Estonian became the new race leader and took the red jersey from Primož Roglič. With the 10 points Taaramäe took at the summit of Picón Blanco, he also became the new leader of the mountains classification and took the blue polka-dot jersey.

Some contenders lost contact with the GC group towards the top. De la Cruz lost 15 seconds to Mas while Hugh Carthy conceded more than 20 seconds. Romain Bardet, Aleksandr Vlasov, and Damiano Caruso conceded 32 seconds to Mas while Richard Carapaz struggled and lost a minute. Additionally, Carapaz was handed a 20-second penalty for taking a feed out of the authorized zone.

Stage 4 
17 August 2021 – El Burgo de Osma to Molina de Aragón, 

Stage 4 covered  from El Burgo de Osma to Molina de Aragón, travelling southeast through central Spain and leaving Castile and León. The undulating route had several hills but no categorised climbs, and it was expected to favour the sprinters. The only point of note along the stage was the intermediate sprint after  of racing, at the top of a small rise in Alcolea del Pinar; bonus seconds were also on offer for the first three riders to cross the sprint line. The road then flattened out before a  uphill drag to the line with gradients between three and seven percent.

Right from the start, a breakaway of three was formed. This trio consisted of three Spaniards, with Joan Bou being joined by the  duo of Ángel Madrazo and Carlos Canal; Canal was the youngest rider in the race at 20 years and 50 days. At that point, the peloton began to close the gap ahead of the intermediate sprint, where Bou took maximum points ahead of Madrazo in second and Canal in third. In the peloton behind, Florian Sénéchal took fourth ahead of the points classification leader, Jasper Philipsen, to limit the losses for his teammate Fabio Jakobsen; Philipsen and Jakobsen were tied for the lead in that classification, with the former wearing the leader's green jersey by virtue of his stage 2 victory. With  to go, race leader Rein Taaramäe went down near the back of the peloton, but he was able to get back up quickly. At the front of the peloton, and  took control for their respective sprinters. In the finale, Sacha Modolo was the first to begin sprinting while looking behind for his teammate Philipsen, who was boxed in behind other sprinters. On the uphill sprint to the line,  led out their sprinter, Arnaud Démare, before Jakobsen emerged from his wheel in the final  to win the stage on the line. With the 50 points he gained at the finish, Jakobsen also took the lead in the points classification. Magnus Cort finished third, while Philipsen settled for ninth.

Because Taaramäe's crash occurred in the final , he was credited with the same time as the peloton, thus retaining the red jersey and the lead in the general classification. The rest of the top 10 in the GC remained unchanged as everyone finished in the peloton.

Stage 5 
18 August 2021 – Tarancón to Albacete, 

The fifth stage of the race took the riders from Tarancón to Albacete with another stage that was expected to suit the sprinters, with the mostly flat route having no categorised climbs.

As soon as the flag dropped, Xabier Azparren, Pelayo Sánchez, and Oier Lazkano broke away from the peloton. The trio extended their lead to as much as seven minutes with  taking control of the peloton. At the intermediate sprint, Lazkano took maximum points with Sánchez in second and Azparren in third. In the peloton, Jasper Philipsen sprinted ahead of Arnaud Démare to edge closer to Fabio Jakobsen's lead in the points classification. Sánchez was the first rider from the break to get dropped, and he was followed soon after by Azparren; this left only Lazkano out front, who would take the stage's combativity award.

The race soon headed inside the final  where there was a threat of crosswinds. Several teams tried to split the peloton into echelons but the wind was not strong enough to cause such splits. Lazkano was swept up by the peloton with  left. Around  from the finish, a big crash brought down several riders; chief among them were Romain Bardet and the race leader, Rein Taaramäe. All riders who crashed would eventually get back up. In the final sprint to the line, Philipsen was led out by his team as he took his second stage of the race ahead of Jakobsen. With the points he gained, Philipsen took the lead in the points classification by a solitary point. Taaramäe finished more than two minutes down while Bardet lost 12 minutes, dropping him out of GC contention. As a result of the former's time loss, second-placed Kenny Elissonde became the new race leader and took the red jersey.

Stage 6 
19 August 2021 – Requena to Alto de Cullera, 

Stage 6 featured a  route from Requena to Cullera that finished atop the third-category climb of the Alto de la Montaña de Cullera. The first  featured several short uncategorised climbs but were net downhill as the riders headed east towards Valencia and the Mediterranean coast. Once there, the route then turned south along the coast, with an intermediate sprint after  in Pinedo on the Valencian outskirts, with bonus seconds also on offer for the first three riders across. The rest of the stage was almost entirely pan-flat until the final  when riders reached the foot of the finishing climb.

Several riders attempted to get into the breakaway but no one was able to get away for the first  of the stage. The first riders to build a gap were Joan Bou and Ryan Gibbons. A three-man chase group of Jetse Bol, Magnus Cort, and Bert-Jan Lindeman managed to bridge up to the duo and the peloton was content to let the quintet go. Guy Niv also attempted to join the break unsuccessfully and he rejoined the peloton shortly thereafter. The quintet led by as much as seven minutes before  began to chase from the peloton. At the intermediate sprint, Bol took maximum points while the peloton passed through at around three and a half minutes down. Most of the contenders made it to the front with the exception of Adam Yates and Hugh Carthy while the race leader, Kenny Elissonde, was also among those caught out.

 from the finish, Carthy was dropped off the back of the peloton. With  and  chasing in the peloton, the break started the final climb with a lead of only 20 seconds. Near the bottom of the climb, Elissonde was dropped by the peloton. The lead quintet began to split on the climb, with Cort emerging as the strongest from the break as he soloed off the front. Inside the final , Michael Matthews attacked from the peloton, followed immediately by Aleksandr Vlasov. After Matthews and Vlasov were caught, Primož Roglič kicked clear with Andrea Bagioli close behind, but Cort held off Roglič on the line to take the stage win.

Vlasov and Enric Mas finished four seconds down while Egan Bernal and the  duo of Miguel Ángel López and Alejandro Valverde finished almost ten seconds down. Yates, David de la Cruz, and Giulio Ciccone conceded more than 20 seconds while a group containing Fabio Aru, Mikel Landa, and Richard Carapaz lost 27 seconds. Carthy suffered the most and conceded almost three minutes. With Elissonde finishing four and a half minutes back, Roglič took back the red jersey, while the  trio of Mas, López, and Valverde moved into second to fourth, respectively. Bernal rounded out the top five on the same time as Valverde.

Stage 7 
20 August 2021 – Gandía to Balcón de Alicante, 

The seventh stage featured another uphill finish as the riders travelled from Gandia to Balcón de Alicante. The stage featured six categorized climbs with the first of these, the first-category Puerto La Llacuna, coming after just . Following the descent and a short flat section, the road gradually went uphill before the riders reached the foot of the third-category Puerto de Benilloba, a  climb with an average gradient of 3.5 percent, followed immediately by the second-category Puerto de Tudons, a  climb with an average gradient of 5.2 percent. A descent and a short uphill section led to the intermediate sprint in Relleu with  left to race. The sprint was followed immediately by the second-category Puerto El Collao, a  climb with an average gradient of 4.6 percent. After the descent, the riders headed to the third-category Puerto de Tibi, a  climb with an average gradient of 5.3 percent. Another short descent led to the final climb of the day, the first-category Balcón de Alicante, an  climb with an average gradient of 6.2 percent. The final  featured gradients of over 10 percent while the finish line came after a short  downhill section at the top.

As soon as the flag dropped, a group of seven riders tried to pull away but they were caught at the bottom of the first climb. Several riders attacked on the climb but no one was able to build a gap over the peloton. Near the top, the peloton split into three groups, with most of the contenders included in the second group. The only exception was Hugh Carthy, who was dropped on the steep part of the climb; he would eventually abandon the race. At the top, Jack Haig took maximum points to tie with Rein Taaramäe at the top of the KOM standings. The GC group bridged up to the front group on the descent, prompting more riders to go on the attack. The easing of the pace allowed some dropped riders to get back to the GC group. However, having missed the break, began to chase with Matteo Trentin. His pace took 22 other riders with him, splitting themselves from the group of favourites. The chase group bridged up to the front with  left to make it 29 riders in the break.

Over the next two climbs, Romain Bardet and Jan Polanc took maximum points for the KOM while  set a steady pace in the peloton. On the climb of Puerto El Collao, the  duo of Chris Hamilton and Michael Storer launched separate attacks from the break but they were both caught. At the top, Bardet took maximum points to take the lead in the KOM competition. On the descent, Lawson Craddock pulled away from the break before eventually being caught by Storer and Pavel Sivakov. On the climb of Puerto de Tibi, Sivakov dropped his chain while Storer dropped Craddock. Sivakov eventually made his way back to Storer on the climb while Craddock made his way back on the descent. On the final climb of the day, Craddock was dropped for good while Carlos Verona and Andreas Kron made their way up front. With  to go, Verona accelerated, dropping Kron while Storer and Sivakov slowly made their way back.  from the finish, Storer attacked, dropping both Sivakov and Verona. He gradually built his lead to solo to the stage win. Verona dropped Sivakov to finish second while Sivakov held on for third. Sivakov did, however, take the blue polka-dot jersey as leader of the KOM competition.

Meanwhile, in the GC group,  was content to let the break go. On the Puerto El Collao, Alejandro Valverde launched an attack, followed by the  duo of Adam Yates and Richard Carapaz. However, just before the group was caught, Valverde crashed heavily on a bend. He tried to ride on, but he would eventually abandon. Miguel Ángel López also attacked on the climb, followed by Carapaz and the race leader Primož Roglič. The move would eventually get shut down. On the final climb, Yates put in a few digs, with Roglič, López, Enric Mas, Egan Bernal, David de la Cruz, and Louis Meintjes the riders able to stay with him to the finish. Aleksandr Vlasov lost 13 seconds while a group containing Carapaz, Giulio Ciccone, Fabio Aru, and Mikel Landa conceded half a minute.

In the GC, Roglič narrowly held on to the red jersey by eight seconds over Felix Großschartner, who was in the break. Mas, López, and Bernal were still 25, 36, and 41 seconds down, respectively. Polanc, Haig, and Sepp Kuss also moved into the top ten after being in the break.

Stage 8 
21 August 2021 – Santa Pola to La Manga del Mar Menor, 

The eighth stage featured another chance for the sprinters as the riders took on a flat stage from Santa Pola to La Manga del Mar Menor. The first part of the stage was mostly flat before the riders passed through the intermediate sprint in Cartagena with  left. Afterwards, there were two short uncategorized climbs which offered a chance for the riders to drop the pure sprinters before a flat run-in to the finish.

Three Spanish riders, Ander Okamika, Aritz Bagües, and Mikel Iturria, attacked at the start of the day. They built a maximum lead of around almost four minutes before  and  sent riders to the front of the peloton to gradually decrease the break's lead. At the intermediate sprint, Bagües took maximum points with Iturria in second and Okamika in third. In the peloton, Jasper Philipsen passed through the intermediate sprint ahead of Arnaud Démare to extend his lead in the points classification. The pace led to the breakaway riders getting swept up, and to the peloton splitting into three groups. The pace eventually eased up, allowing many of the dropped riders to make it back to the front. With  to go, Jetse Bol accelerated off the front but he was quickly brought back by the surging peloton. In the final sprint to the line, Fabio Jakobsen launched his sprint with  left and held off the other sprinters to take his second stage win of the race. Alberto Dainese crossed the line in second while Philipsen finished third. With his win, Jakobsen took back the green jersey from Philipsen. The top ten remained unchanged as Primož Roglič kept the red jersey.

Stage 9 
22 August 2021 – Puerto Lumbreras to Alto de Velefique, 

The last stage before the first rest day featured another mountainous course, with the riders finishing at the summit of the Alto de Velefique. The first  went downhill before the riders gradually climbed towards the second-category Alto de Cuatro Vientos, a  climb with an average gradient of 3.8 percent. Following the descent, the riders climbed towards the intermediate sprint in Tijola with  still to race. Afterwards, the riders immediately started the first-category climb of Alto Collado Venta Luisa. Towards the top, there was a  section which averages 9.2 percent in gradient. After the descent, the riders reached the foot of the final climb, the special category Alto de Velefique.

Multiple riders attempted to break away but the fast pace in the peloton meant that no break was established until  to go, when until a group of seven riders went away. That group swelled to 11 after four more riders bridged across. The break built a lead of almost four minutes before  set a furious pace on the Alto Collado Venta Luisa. Romain Bardet tried unsuccessfully to bridge up to Caruso as the Italian gradually built his lead over the rest of the break.  soon set a steady pace in the peloton, allowing Caruso to extend his lead to two minutes over the peloton at the top of the climb, while the chasing group, which had been reduced to four riders, crossed the top at a minute and a half behind Caruso. Bardet took second at the top to take over the lead in the mountains classification.

Following the descent, Geoffrey Bouchard attacked from the peloton, eventually bridging up to the chase group composed of Bardet, Julen Amezqueta, and Rafał Majka. Just before the penultimate climb of the Alto de Castro de Filabres, Caruso extended his lead over the chasers to two minutes while  stopped pulling in the peloton, allowing Caruso's lead over the peloton to balloon to over four minutes. He gradually extended his lead over the chasers over the rest of the stage to solo to the stage win. By taking maximum points at the summit of the Alto de Velefique, Caruso took over the lead in the mountains classification.

In the GC group,  set a steady pace as they headed towards the foot of the final climb. On the climb's steepest section, Adam Yates accelerated, with Miguel Ángel López following him. Primož Roglič soon bridged up to the duo, bringing Egan Bernal and Enric Mas with him. After the pace eased for a while, Yates put in a few more digs, splitting the GC group and catching the remnants of the breakaway with the exception of Caruso. Roglič and Mas worked together to extend their lead over a chase group consisting of Yates, Bernal, López, and Jack Haig. Towards the top, Bernal was dropped from the chase group. At the line, Roglič took second, gapping Mas by a second and gaining two additional bonus seconds. Yates, Haig, and López finished 39 seconds behind Roglič while Bernal, Giulio Ciccone, and Gino Mäder crossed the line more than a minute down. In the GC, Roglič extended his lead to 28 seconds over Mas, the only rider within a minute of the Slovenian's lead. López rounded out the podium at 1' 21" down while Haig moved up to fourth at 1' 42" behind. Bernal rounded out the top five at 1' 52" down with his teammate, Yates, a further 15 seconds in arrears.

Rest day 1 
23 August 2021 – Almería

Stage 10 
24 August 2021 – Roquetas de Mar to Rincón de la Victoria, 

The tenth stage of the race took the riders from Roquetas de Mar to Rincón de la Victoria. Most of the stage featured rolling terrain with several small uncategorised hills along the way. At the summit, bonus seconds were on offer for the first three riders to cross, before a  technical descent led to the finish in Rincón de la Victoria.

The start of the stage featured another furious fight for the break as several riders attempted to pull away. A trio composed of Florian Sénéchal, Jordi Meeus, and Jan Tratnik briefly got away but they were caught after  of racing. The best-placed riders on GC in the break were Odd Christian Eiking at 9' 10" down at the start of the day, with Guillaume Martin a further 29 seconds behind. The large group immediately built their advantage as  began to control the peloton. Shortly after passing through the intermediate sprint, Matteo Trentin, Alex Aranburu, Jesús Herrada, and Floris De Tier attacked from the break. The quartet reached the foot of the Puerto de Almáchar with a lead of almost half a minute.

On the climb itself, De Tier tried to attack off the front but was caught by the chasers along with Aranburu, Trentin, and Herrada. Rui Oliveira was the next to make a move before he was followed by Kenny Elissonde. Both riders were caught by the other chasers, which had splintered on the climb. Towards the top, Michael Storer attacked off the front. Clément Champoussin tried to follow unsuccessfully, while Storer gradually built his gap to around 40 seconds by the summit. On the descent, Champoussin was caught by Eiking, Mauri Vansevenant, and Dylan van Baarle. They came to within 20 seconds of catching Storer but the Australian held on to take his second stage win of the race. The first group of chasers finished 22 seconds later.

In the GC group,  gradually let the break increase their lead to more than 13 minutes, which meant that Eiking was the virtual GC leader for much of the day. On the steepest section of the Puerto de Almáchar, race leader Primož Roglič accelerated from the group. No one was able to follow him immediately while a group of chasers composed of Jack Haig and the  duo of Enric Mas and Miguel Ángel López formed behind. Roglič's teammate, Sepp Kuss, was also able to follow the chasers before he was eventually dropped. The  duo of Egan Bernal and Adam Yates struggled as they were unable to follow the moves, while Roglič led by around 20 seconds over the top of the climb. On the descent, Roglič's rear wheel slipped during a turn, causing him to crash. Though he was immediately able to get back up, his small advantage had evaporated and he was soon caught by Mas, López, and Haig. Near the finish, Kuss, Aleksandr Vlasov, and Felix Großschartner managed to bridge up to the quartet. They crossed the line at almost 12 minutes behind Storer while Bernal, Yates, and several other contenders finished a further 37 seconds in arrears. As a result of his time gain over Roglič, Eiking took the red jersey by a margin of 58 seconds over Guillaume Martin, who moved up to second, while Roglič led the rest of the GC contenders at 2' 17" down.

Stage 11 
25 August 2021 – Antequera to Valdepeñas de Jaén, 

The eleventh stage featured a hilly stage as the riders headed towards an uphill finish in Valdepeñas de Jaén, which has previously hosted stage finishes in 2010, 2011, and 2013. The first  of the stage featured undulating terrain before the riders tackled short hills and several uncategorized climbs over the next . The intermediate sprint took place in Alcalá la Real with  left.  from the finish, the riders took on the second-category Puerto de Locubín, an  climb with an average gradient of 5 percent, which offered bonus seconds to the first three riders over the summit. A short descent led to the final kilometre where the riders headed uphill to the finish in Valdepeñas de Jaén. The final kilometre had an average gradient of around 9 percent but featured gradients of more than 20 percent.

Before the stage started,  announced that Jasper Philipsen, who had won two sprint stages and was in contention for the points classification, had withdrawn from the race due to a mild fever. Alex Aranburu also withdrew following a crash the previous day. After the flag dropped, it took around  before a group of five broke away from the peloton. The group contained Edward Planckaert, Jonathan Lastra, Magnus Cort, Joan Bou, and Harm Vanhoucke. After the break was formed, having missed the break, attempted to bring the quintet back but they were unable to do so. Their advantage hovered between one and two minutes before finally coming down below a minute as the riders neared the Puerto de Locubín.

On the climb, Cort dropped his breakaway companions with Vanhoucke hovering between Cort and the chasing peloton. Cort summitted with a lead of around 20 seconds; behind de la Cruz was caught at the top of the climb by the peloton as mountains classification leader Damiano Caruso made a surge to add three more points to his lead. Cort maintained his advantage on the descent, eventually reaching the final kilometre with a lead of just under 20 seconds. In the peloton, led out for Primož Roglič, who soon took to the front with Enric Mas. They passed Cort with  left, and in the sprint to the line, Roglič pulled away from Mas to take his second stage win of the race. Mas finished in second at three seconds behind while his teammate, Miguel Ángel López, took third at five seconds down. Jack Haig led in a group at seven seconds down while Egan Bernal and race leader Odd Christian Eiking finished in a group a further four seconds in arrears.

In the GC, Eiking maintained his 58-second advantage over Guillaume Martin. Roglič extended his advantage over Mas to 35 seconds with López at 1' 32" behind the Slovenian. Haig, Bernal, and Adam Yates also maintained their respective positions, though each with a slightly larger deficit to Roglič.

Notes

References

Sources

External links 

2021 Vuelta a España
Vuelta a España stages